The men's singles SU5 tournament of the 2022 BWF Para-Badminton World Championships took place from 1 to 6 November.

Seeds 

 Cheah Liek Hou (champion)
 Fang Jen-yu (quarter-finals)
 Taiyo Imai (semi-finals)
 Méril Loquette (quarter-finals)
 Bartłomiej Mróz (first round)
 Suryo Nugroho (semi-finals)
 Dheva Anrimusthi (final)
 Chirag Baretha (first round)

Group stage 
All times are local (UTC+9).

Group A

Group B

Group C

Group D

Group E

Group F

Group G

Group H

Knock-out stage

Reference 

Sports competitions in Tokyo
Badminton tournaments in Japan
2022 in Japanese sport
2022 in badminton
International sports competitions hosted by Japan
BWF Para-Badminton World Championships